Maestro Mensah is a Ghanaian footballer who is last known to have been part of Morvant Caledonia United of the TT Pro League in 2016.

Trinidad and Tobago

Switching from Cunupia to Morvant Caledonia United of the TT Pro League in 2016, Mensah won the 2016 Lucozade Goal Shield with the club, saying that a defensive style of play was entrenched in their team.

Made an own goal on the 11th minute in a 3–2 defeat to Central.

References 

Living people
Association football defenders
Expatriate footballers in Trinidad and Tobago
Ghanaian footballers
TT Pro League players
Ghanaian expatriate footballers
Year of birth missing (living people)
Morvant Caledonia United players